Sonbolabad Rural District is in the Central District of Soltaniyeh County, Zanjan province, Iran. At the National Census of 2006, its population was 8,069 in 2,050 households, when it was in Soltaniyeh District of Abhar County. There were 7,956 inhabitants in 2,381 households at the following census of 2011. At the most recent census of 2016, the population of the rural district was 8,318 in 2,582 households, by which time it was in the Central District of the recently established Soltaniyeh County. The largest of its 15 villages was Viyar, with 3,548 people.

References 

Soltaniyeh County

Rural Districts of Zanjan Province

Populated places in Zanjan Province

Populated places in Soltaniyeh County